Jeremy Clarkson's Motorworld is a BBC television series about the car and motoring cultures of various countries. The show was presented by Jeremy Clarkson and consisted of two series of six episodes each plus a special focusing on the UK. Each episode focused on a different country or region. The series was first shown in the UK on BBC Two in 1995, and was subsequently shown to an international audience on BBC World. It has also been repeated on Dave. The Best Of Jeremy Clarkson's Motorworld, a video containing 70 minutes of highlights from the series was released on 7 October 1996. The video was later released on DVD as part of The Jeremy Clarkson Collection in 2007. There was also a book written by Clarkson based on the series. Clarkson described the series as: "From the sports cars of the wealthy in Monaco to the 1950s Morris Oxfords that still rule the roads in India, this is a lighthearted look at the culture of the car in 12 countries. His travels include visits to Italy, home of the Ferrari – a steel deity, sex on wheels"; Japan, where he has a brush with the local Mercedes-driving mafia; and Iceland, where he takes his life in his hands and hurtles around the most dangerous off-the-road course in the world in a customized 4WD jeep.

Episode list

References

All transmission dates and episode names are taken from Motorworld's entry in the BBC Programme catalogue.

BBC Television shows
Automotive television series
1995 British television series debuts
1996 British television series endings
Driving in the United Kingdom